Hilliard Middle-Senior High School is a public combined middle-senior high school located in Hilliard, Florida. It is part of the Nassau County School District and serves grades 6 through 12. For athletics, the school's nickname and mascot is the Hilliard Flashes, named after the Town of Hilliard's previous status as the statistical lightning capital of Florida.

Notable alumni
Daniel Thomas, National Football League player for the Miami Dolphins

References

External links
 Hilliard Middle-Senior High School Home Page
 Athletic Programs

Public high schools in Florida
High schools in Nassau County, Florida